Lutz Langer is a Paralympic athlete from Germany competing mainly in category F40 shot put events.

Lutz has competed in the shot put at the 2004 and 2008 Summer Paralympics winning the silver medal in 2004.

References

Paralympic athletes of Germany
Athletes (track and field) at the 2004 Summer Paralympics
Athletes (track and field) at the 2008 Summer Paralympics
Paralympic silver medalists for Germany
Living people
Medalists at the 2004 Summer Paralympics
Year of birth missing (living people)
Paralympic medalists in athletics (track and field)
German male shot putters